Ebo is a genus of running crab spiders that was first described by Eugen von Keyserling in 1884.

Species
 it contains thirteen species, found only in North America, Asia, and Argentina:
Ebo bharatae Tikader, 1965 – India (mainland, Andaman Is.)
Ebo bucklei Platnick, 1972 – Canada
Ebo carmineus Mello-Leitão, 1944 – Argentina
Ebo contrastus Sauer & Platnick, 1972 – USA
Ebo distinctivus Lyakhov, 1992 – Kazakhstan, Russia (South Siberia)
Ebo evansae Sauer & Platnick, 1972 – USA, Mexico
Ebo fuscus Mello-Leitão, 1943 – Argentina
Ebo iviei Sauer & Platnick, 1972 – USA, Canada
Ebo latithorax Keyserling, 1884 (type) – USA, Canada
Ebo meridionalis Mello-Leitão, 1942 – Argentina
Ebo merkeli Schick, 1965 – USA
Ebo pepinensis Gertsch, 1933 – USA, Canada
Ebo punctatus Sauer & Platnick, 1972 – USA

See also
 List of Philodromidae species

References

Araneomorphae genera
Philodromidae
Spiders of Asia
Spiders of North America
Spiders of Russia
Spiders of South America
Taxa named by Eugen von Keyserling